Lajpat Nagar is an interchange station between Violet Line and Pink Line of the Delhi Metro in Delhi. It is located between Jangpura and Moolchand on the Violet Line in Lajpat Nagar. The station was opened with the first section of the Violet Line on 3 October 2010, in time for the Commonwealth Games opening ceremony on the same day.
It became an interchange station with the opening of the Pink Line on 6 August 2018. The station on the Pink Line is underground, whereas the Violet line station is elevated. However, both the lines are seamlessly connected, without commuters having to exit the ticketed area to interchange from one line to another.

Lajpat Nagar Market is one of the famous shopping market in Delhi which is famous for women's clothes, artificial jewelry, Footwear, household electronics and Home Decor items. This market is walking distance from Lajpat Nagar Metro Station and rickshaws can be hired easily for traveling back and forth. Timings of this market is 11:00 AM to 08:00 PM

The station

Facilities
HDFC Bank, SBI, RBL Bank ATMs,food court are available at Lajpat Nagar metro station.

Station Layout

Nearby
Lajpat Nagar Central Market, Amar Colony, Defence Colony, Acharya Munir Ashram, Rajkumari Amrit Kaur College of Nursing, Haldiram's, The Japan Foundation, Guru Nanak Market, Ziyyara Edutech Private Limited, RPVV Lajpat Nagar, GCoSSS lajpat nagar.

See also

Delhi
List of Delhi Metro stations
Transport in Delhi
Delhi Monorail
South Delhi
New Delhi
National Capital Region (India)
List of rapid transit systems
List of metro systems

References

External links

 Delhi Metro Rail Corporation Ltd. (Official site) 
 Delhi Metro Annual Reports
 
 UrbanRail.Net – Descriptions of all metro systems in the world, each with a schematic map showing all stations.

Delhi Metro stations
Railway stations opened in 2010
Railway stations in South Delhi district
Memorials to Lala Lajpat Rai